Catantopini is a tribe in the subfamily Catantopinae, a group of grasshoppers found in Africa, Asia and Australia.

Subtribes & Genera

The Orthoptera Species File lists the following (genera incomplete):
 subtribe Apotropina Key, 1993 - Australia
 Apotropis Bolívar, 1906
 Azelota Brunner von Wattenwyl, 1893
 Burcatelia Sjöstedt, 1930
 Clepsydria Sjöstedt, 1920
 Epallia Sjöstedt, 1921
 Fipurga Sjöstedt, 1921
 Goniaeoidea Sjöstedt, 1920
 Percassa Sjöstedt, 1921
 Perunga Sjöstedt, 1921
 Schayera Key, 1990
 subtribe Aretzina Key, 1993 - Australia
 Aretza Sjöstedt, 1921
 Brachyexarna Sjöstedt, 1921
 Exarna Brunner von Wattenwyl, 1893
 Macrocara Uvarov, 1930
 Terpillaria Sjöstedt, 1920
 Zebratula Sjöstedt, 1920
 subtribe Buforaniina Key, 1993 - Australia
 Buforania Sjöstedt, 1920
 Cuparessa Sjöstedt, 1921
 Phanerocerus Saussure, 1888
 Raniliella Sjöstedt, 1921
 Tapesta Sjöstedt, 1921
 subtribe Catantopina Brunner von Wattenwyl, 1893 - Africa, Asia, Australia
 Catantops Schaum, 1853
 Catantopsilus Ramme, 1929
 Catantopsis Bolívar, 1912
 Diabolocatantops Jago, 1984
 Nisiocatantops Dirsh, 1953: N. orientalis (Kirby, 1888)
 Stenocatantops Dirsh, 1953
 subtribe Cirphulina Key, 1993 - Australia
 Chirotepica Sjöstedt, 1936
 Cirphula Stål, 1873
 Macrolopholia Sjöstedt, 1920
 subtribe Coryphistina Mistshenko, 1952 - Australia
 Adreppus Sjöstedt, 1921
 Beplessia Sjöstedt, 1921
 Camelophistes Key, 1994
 Charpentierella Key, 1994
 Coryphistes Charpentier, 1845
 Euophistes Sjöstedt, 1920
 Macrolobalia Sjöstedt, 1921
 Relatta Sjöstedt, 1921
 Spectrophistes Key, 1994
 subtribe Cratilopina Key, 1993 - Australia
 Caperrala Sjöstedt, 1921
 Cratilopus Bolívar, 1906
 Exarhalltia Sjöstedt, 1930
 Typaya Sjöstedt, 1921

Subtribes E-

 subtribe Ecphantina Key, 1993 - Malesia, Australia
 Alectorolophellus Ramme, 1941
 Alectorolophus Brunner von Wattenwyl, 1898
 Althaemenes Stål, 1878
 Ecphantus Stål, 1878
 Happarana Sjöstedt, 1920
 Lyrolophus Ramme, 1941
 Mengkokacris Ramme, 1941
 Paralectorolophus Ramme, 1941
 Sulawesiana Koçak & Kemal, 2008
 subtribe Eumecistina Key, 1993 - Australia
 Asoramea Sjöstedt, 1921
 Cervidia Stål, 1878
 Erythropomala Sjöstedt, 1920
 Eumecistes Brancsik, 1896
 Euomopalon Sjöstedt, 1920
 Genurellia Sjöstedt, 1931
 Microphistes Sjöstedt, 1920
 Pardillana Sjöstedt, 1920
 Pespulia Sjöstedt, 1921
 Retuspia Sjöstedt, 1921
 subtribe Goniaeina Key, 1993 - Australia (monotypic)
 Goniaea Stål, 1873
 subtribe Hepalicina Key, 1993 - Australia (monotypic)
 Hepalicus Sjöstedt, 1921
 subtribe Loiteriina Key, 1993 - Australia (monotypic)
 Loiteria Sjöstedt, 1921
 subtribe Maclystriina Key, 1993 - Australia
 Maclystria Sjöstedt, 1921
 Perloccia Sjöstedt, 1936
 subtribe Macrazelotina Key, 1993 - Australia
 Macrazelota Sjöstedt, 1921
 Rusurplia Sjöstedt, 1930
 subtribe Macrotonina Key, 1993 - Australia
 Macrotona Brunner von Wattenwyl, 1893
 Theomolpus Bolívar, 1918
 Xypechtia Sjöstedt, 1921
 subtribe Micreolina Key, 1993 - Australia
 Micreola Sjöstedt, 1920
 Sjoestedtacris Baehr, 1992
 Sumbilvia Sjöstedt, 1921

Subtribes P-

 subtribe Peakesiina Key, 1993 - Australia
 Caloptilla Sjöstedt, 1921
 Catespa Sjöstedt, 1921
 Cedarinia Sjöstedt, 1920
 Cuprascula Sjöstedt, 1921
 Curpilladia Sjöstedt, 1934
 Desertaria Sjöstedt, 1920
 Lagoonia Sjöstedt, 1931
 Peakesia Sjöstedt, 1920
 Perelytrana Sjöstedt, 1936
 Testudinellia Sjöstedt, 1930
 Xanterriaria Sjöstedt, 1934
 Yrrhapta Sjöstedt, 1921
 Zabrala Sjöstedt, 1921
 subtribe Perbelliina Key, 1993 - PNG, Australia, New Zealand
 Ablectia Sjöstedt, 1921
 Capraxa Sjöstedt, 1920
 Minyacris Key, 1992
 Perbellia Sjöstedt, 1920
 Phaulacridium Brunner von Wattenwyl, 1893
 Porraxia Sjöstedt, 1921
 Rectitropis Sjöstedt, 1936
 subtribe Russalpiina Key, 1993 - Tasmania, New Zealand
 Russalpia Sjöstedt, 1921
 Sigaus Hutton, 1898
 Tasmanalpina Key, 1991
 Tasmaniacris Sjöstedt, 1932
 Truganinia Key, 1991
 subtribe Stropina Brunner von Wattenwyl, 1893 - Australia
 Adlappa Sjöstedt, 1920
 Collitera Sjöstedt, 1921
 Parazelum Sjöstedt, 1921
 Stropis Stål, 1873
 subtribe Urnisina Key, 1993 - Australia
 Rhitzala Sjöstedt, 1921
 Urnisa Stål, 1861

subtribe not placed

 Dimeracris Niu & Zheng, 1993 - China
 Phaeocatantops Dirsh, 1953 - Africa
 Stenocrobylus Gerstaecker, 1869 - Africa, India
 Trichocatantops Uvarov, 1953 - Africa
 Xenocatantops Dirsh, 1953 - Africa, India, China, Indo-China, Malesia, New Guinea

References

External links 
 
 

Acrididae
Orthoptera tribes
Taxa named by Carl Brunner von Wattenwyl